The Expert Infantryman Badge, or EIB, is a special skills badge of the United States Army.

The EIB was created with the CIB by executive order in November 1943 during World War II. Currently, it is awarded to U.S. Army personnel who hold infantry or special forces military occupational specialties with the exception of soldiers with the occupational specialty of Special Forces Medical Sergeant (18D). To be awarded the EIB, the soldier must complete a number of prerequisites and pass a battery of graded tests on basic infantry skills.

Personnel who have been awarded both the EIB and the CIB are not authorized to wear both badges simultaneously. In such cases, Army Regulations allow the recipient to choose which badge is worn. A similar badge exists for medical personnel, known as the Expert Field Medical Badge (EFMB). In 2017, talks about a similar badge were being discussed for soldiers without the occupation of infantry, medical, or special forces were put on the table and in 2019 the army established the Expert Soldier Badge for soldiers who do not qualify for both the EIB and EFMB.

The EIB is a silver and enamel badge, consisting of a 3-inch-wide (76 mm) rectangular bar with an infantry-blue field upon which is superimposed a Springfield Arsenal Musket, Model 1795. Although similar in name and appearance to the Combat Infantryman Badge (CIB), it is a completely different award. While the CIB is awarded to infantry soldiers for participation in ground combat, the EIB is presented for completion of a course of testing designed to demonstrate proficiency in infantry skills.

Modern requirements (2000s)

A primary Military Occupational Specialty (MOS) in Career Management Fields (CMF) 11 (Infantry) or 18 (Special Forces) series, except 18Ds (Special Forces Medical Sergeant).

EIB Physical Fitness Assessment: Each candidate (regardless of sex or age) is required to complete 49 push-ups, 59 sit-ups and finish a 4 mile run in 32 minutes or less. 
 
Land navigation: complete a day and a night land navigation course within a specified timeframe; 
 
Weapon qualification: earn an "expert" qualification on their assigned weapon, typically an M16/M4; in the case of mortarmen (MOS 11C) expert qualification on the mortar is an additional requirement.
 
Forced foot march: complete a 12-mile foot march, carrying M4 and 35 lb. load + extra gear for a total of up to 70 lbs, within three hours. 
 
Lane or station testing in individual tasks, graded as pass/fail ("GO"/"NO GO"). There are approximately 30–35 stations in this phase.  Candidates must pass every station; if they receive a "NO GO" on their first attempt, they have one chance to retest.  A second "NO GO" at any station results in a failure for the entire testing phase.  Generally there are multiple stations in all the following areas (less common/defunct tasks in italics):
     
 First Aid
 Chemical, Biological, Radiological, Nuclear (CBRN) procedures
 Call for Fire (indirect fire), CAS (close air support), and Close Combat Attack
 Techniques for movement under fire, camouflage, hand-signaling, range estimation, and reporting contact to higher headquarters
 Communications: competency with ASIP, SINCGARS, MBITR or PRC-152 field radios and procedures
 Map reading: terrain identification, topography, use of military GPS
 Weapons proficiency: load, unload, perform function checks, clear, correct malfunctions, etc. for M9, M16/M4, M203, M249, M240B, M60, M2, Mk 19, AT4, Javelin; employ hand grenades, Claymore, and anti-tank mines
 Proficiency with night vision devices
 Boresighting proficiency

Foreign militaries are often invited to participate in the EIB when units are overseas or in host nation countries. Such countries to participate in the EIB are Bosnia, Korea, Poland and more.

Terminology and ritual
While training in basic skills is a major goal of the EIB program, the EIB institution additionally provides an area of common experience and vocabulary across the infantry in the US Army.  This test comes around about once every 2 years to most Infantry units.  Those who fail could wait over a year before they have the opportunity to try again.  Most likely they will transfer or PCS to another Infantry unit that may or may not be testing that year.  Thus, the wait to retest could be longer.

Sociologically, the testing phase especially acts as a rite of passage for many infantrymen.  The period of testing usually stretches over several days, with the number of candidates remaining steadily dwindling and pressure similarly increasing.  Traditionally, hand grenades (where the candidate has five grenades to hit three different targets) and call for fire are considered the most difficult tests.

There is a specific slang vocabulary associated with EIB testing.  Graders at each station usually have EIBs themselves; a badge protector is therefore a particularly difficult grader, perceived to be protecting the status of the award which he holds.  Graders typically carry a blue pen to mark "GO"s and a red pen to mark "NO GO"s; to complete the entire phase without a single NO GO is therefore to go true blue.  Similarly, if a candidate has one "NO GO” he is said to be blade running; any mistake will eliminate him.  Usually if the candidate makes a mistake and time has not run out, the grader will tell the candidate "you still have time remaining", which is a clue that the candidate may have done something wrong. On occasion, the grader will do this to unnerve the candidate even though everything is correct, which completes the rite of passage.

References

External links
EIB Home
USAIS 350-6: The official document governing the EIB
STX Lane Update
Purpose of the EIB
History of the EIB
Army Study Guide site
 578.72  Expert Infantryman Badge
Institute of Heraldry Expert Infantryman Badge

United States military badges
Awards and decorations of the United States Army